Operation Drop Kick was conducted between April and November 1956 by the US Army Chemical Corps to test the practicality of employing mosquitoes to carry an entomological warfare agent in different ways. The Chemical Corps released uninfected female mosquitoes into a cooperative residential area of Savannah, Georgia, and then estimated how many mosquitoes entered houses and bit people. Within a day, the mosquitoes had bitten many people. In 1958, the Chemical Corps released 1,000,000 mosquitoes in Avon Park, Florida.

These tests showed that mosquitoes could be spread by means of various devices.

The 1964 movie Dr. Strangelove also refers to an Operation Drop Kick.

The TV series Archer refers to Operation Drop Kick as the codename of a CIA mission to take over a country in Latin America.

See also
Human experimentation in the United States
Operation Big Buzz
Operation Big Itch
Operation May Day

References

Drop Kick
Drop Kick
Drop Kick
1956 in the United States